Gor is a 1987 science fiction fantasy film. It was loosely based on the 1966 novel Tarnsman of Gor, the first in the Gor series of sword and planet novels. The series was written by philosophy professor and author John Frederick Lange Jr. under his pen name John Norman. There was a sequel to the film, Outlaw of Gor (1989).

Plot
After being snubbed before a weekend-getaway by his teaching assistant, socially awkward professor of physics Tarl Cabot accidentally unlocks the magical properties of a ring which transports him to the planet Gor. After his arrival, Cabot encounters a village being attacked by the army of the tyrannical priest-king Sarm. Sarm's forces are invading neighboring settlements in an effort to retrieve the Home Stone, a mystical object that creates pathways between Gor and distant Earth.  Cabot too is abruptly attacked by Sarm's warriors. After inadvertently killing Sarm's own son during the encounter, he is left for dead in the desert.  He awakens to find himself being nursed back to health by Talena (Rebecca Ferratti), a scantily clad barbarian princess of the Kingdom of Ko-ro-ba.  Cabot learns that Talena's father, the King, has been captured by Sarm, along with the Home Stone. Cabot travels with Talena on a rescue mission to Sarm's lands, where they are captured.  Cabot leads a group of rebels in an escape effort, whereupon Cabot is able to kill Sarm, rescue Talena and her father, and reacquire the Home Stone.  Tarl et al. return to Ko-ro-ba, where, after Cabot and Talena admit their love for one another, Cabot accidentally activates the Home Stone, and is returned to Earth.

Cast
 Urbano Barberini as Tarl Cabot
 Rebecca Ferratti as Talena
 Jack Palance as Xenos
 Paul L. Smith as Surbus
 Oliver Reed as Sarm
 Larry Taylor as King Marlenus
 Graham Clarke as Drusus
 Janine Denison as Brandy
 Donna Denton as Queen Lara
 Jenifer Oltman as Tafa
 Martina Brockschmidt as Dorna
 Anne Power as Beverly
 Arnold Vosloo as Norman
 Chris du Plessis as Sarsam
 Ivan Kruger as Sarm's Rider
 Joe Ribeiro as Auctioneer
 Visser du Plessis as Compound Guard
 Philip Van der Byl as Whipman
 George Magnussen as Old Man
 Fred Potgieter as Brand Master
 Etty Orgad as Hooded Woman
 Amanda Haramis as Hooded Woman
 Eve Joss as Auction Slave
 Bobby Lovegreen as Sarsam's Rider
 Rick Skidmore as Prisoner
 Vic Tearnan as Body Guard
 Andre du Plessis as Body Guard
 Fred Swart as Feast Master
 Nobby Clark as Merchant
 Nigel Chipps as Hup

Production
Cannon Films had initially planned to release the film in September of 1987, but the theatrical release was cancelled.

Critical reception
Gor was widely panned upon its release (and subsequently remembered) for its poor production value and camp.  The film has been the target of criticism for its overt sexual themes, and its portrayal of women as slaves to men.

In a 2002 interview with online fanzine The Gorean Voice, John Norman recalled that Ballantine Books, holder of the rights to his novels, balked at the idea of publishing movie tie-in books. He said that Ballantine had to be circumvented in order to make the movie: 
Ballantine Books refused to do movie tie-ins to either film; they failed even to answer my letters. My attorney finessed his way around Ballantine's rights department and contacted the legal department at Random House. The movies were made by going over the heads of the censors.

References

External links
 
 
 
 

Gor
1987 films
1987 fantasy films
1980s science fiction films
1980s English-language films
English-language South African films
Films directed by Fritz Kiersch
Films scored by Pino Donaggio
Films set on fictional planets
Films shot in South Africa
Films shot in Mauritius
Films based on American novels
Films based on science fiction novels
Golan-Globus films
Sword and planet films
Films produced by Avi Lerner